Taiwan Railways Administration (TRA) is a railway operator in Taiwan. It is an agency of the Ministry of Transportation and Communications, responsible for managing, maintaining, and running conventional passenger and freight railway services on 1097 km of track in Taiwan.

Due to Taiwan's heavily urbanised landscape and high population density, railways have played an important part in domestic transportation since the late 19th century. Passenger traffic in 2018 was 231,267,955.

The agency's headquarters are in Zhongzheng District, Taipei.

Overview

Railway services, between Keelung and Hsinchu, began in 1891 under China's Qing dynasty, because the railway was completely rebuilt and substantially expanded under the  operated by Formosa's Japanese colonial government (1895–1945), the network's Japanese influence and heritage persists. Similarities between the TRA and the Japan Railways (JR) companies can be found in signal aspects, signage, track layout, fare controls, station architecture, and operating procedures. As Japan's southern base during World War II, Taiwan's railways suffered significant damage by Allied air raids.

The TRA is a government organisation that falls under Taiwan's Ministry of Transportation and Communication (MOTC) and employs around 13,500 people (4,700 in transportation and 7,700 in maintenance titles) and directly operates some 682 route miles of 3’6” (1,067 mm) gauge railways. Three mainlines form a complete circle around the island. TRA's West Coast line and Badu-Hualien section feature mostly double-track, electrification, modern colour light and cab
signalling, overrun protection, and centralized traffic control (CTC). South-link line, east coast Taitung (converted from 762 mm gauge), and three “tourist” branches are non-electrified
single-track with passing sidings.

Since the early 1980s, conventional railway capital improvements are nationally funded and managed by the MOTC's Railway Reconstruction Bureau, then turned over to TRA for operations. Taiwan's challenging terrain meant all lines feature extensive tunneling and long bridges. Double-tracking frequently requires construction of parallel single-track railroads or bypass tunnels on new alignments.
The US$14.5 billion standard gauge high-speed rail (HSR) line was built and operated by a separate public-private partnership under a 35-year concession, but TRA provides feeder services to HSR terminals. Although TRA operates all commuter rail, other quasi-private organizations operate subways in Taipei and Kaohsiung.

Local and intercity passenger services (5am – 1am, very few overnight trains) operate at 95.3% on-time performance. 2008 annual passenger ridership was 179 million (incurring 5.45 billion passenger-miles), generating US$434 million in revenue. Commuter trains carry 76% of riders (43% of passenger miles). WCML carries >90% of ridership. TRA's loose-car and unit-train bulk freight services haul mainly aggregates (58% of tonnage), cement (26%), and coal (9%). In 2008, 9.5 million tons of freight (481 million ton-miles) generated US$28.6 million in revenue. Limited container services operate between the port of Hualien and suburban Taipei, but loading gauge restrictions preclude piggyback operations. During typhoon season, small trucks are carried on flatcars when highways are closed by flooding or mudslides.

In years past, an extensive shipper-owned light railway network (762 mm gauge, never operated by TRA) handled freight services throughout Taiwan and once boasted 1,800 route miles. Largely abandoned today, it served important industries including sugar, logging, coal, salt, and minerals.
Unlike JR East and Hong Kong's Mass Transit Railway, revenues from ancillary businesses accounts for only 17.8% of TRA's revenues. TRA's estimated farebox recovery ratio (including freight operations) is ~40%.

Staffing costs, pension benefits, capital debt, changing demographics, highway competition, and low fare policies resulted in accumulated deficits nearing US$3.3 billion. Locally considered large and
problematic, TRA's deficits pale in comparison to those incurred by European and U.S. transit agencies, and Japan National Railways (JNR) prior to its 1987 privatization. Like JNR and U.S. transit authorities, interest payments on long-term debt represents a significant burden for TRA. Planning for TRA's restructuring had been underway since 2000.

Recent growth in the highway system and increased competition from bus companies and airlines has led to a decline in long-distance rail travel (except during major holidays such as Chinese New Year), though short and intermediate distance travel is still heavily utilized by commuters and students. The high-speed rail line is not run by TRA, and is also a major source of competition. To offset this TRA has begun placing an emphasis on tourism and short-distance commuter service. This has led to several special tourist trains running to scenic areas and hot springs, the addition of dining cars (originally deemed unnecessary due to Taiwan's relatively small size), and converting several smaller branch lines to attract tourists. Additionally, several new stations have been added in major metropolitan areas, and local commuter service increased. Its boxed lunches remain the company's most popular product with sales totaling NT$320 million (US$10.8 million) in 2010 (around 5% of its annual revenue).

On December 31, 2010, the TRA signed a NT$10.6 billion contract with Sumitomo Group and Nippon Sharyo to supply 17 tilting train sets capable of traveling . These eight-car electric multiple units (EMUs) were delivered from 2012 to 2014 for Taroko Express services running between Taipei and Hualien on the east coast lines. The system achieved a single day record on February 5, 2011 during Chinese New Year celebrations, transporting 724,000 passengers a day.

History

The first Taiwanese railway was completed during the Qing era in 1893. In 1895, the Qing Empire ceded Formosa (Taiwan) to the Empire of Japan after the First Sino-Japanese War.

The Official Japanese Annual Report of 1935 states (under title Colonial Railways Section II Taiwan):

Timeline
1887: Construction begins on first railway in Taiwan between Keelung and Taipei in early March. (Imperial approbation obtained by Qing dynasty governor Liu Ming-chuan, as part of development of new Taiwan Province.)
1891: First rail line completed;  branch from Twatutia to Keelung, driven by English engineers
1893: First Formosa railway completed.
1895: Taiwan ceded to Japan by China following the end of the First Sino-Japanese War. Ministry of Taiwan Railway established by the Japanese Government. Reconstruction begins of Kīrun-Taihoku branch to avoid numerous short curves and steep grades. Work is also performed on the line leading from Taihoku to the south. Total cost of these improvements reaching nearly two million yen. Railway under direct control of the Military Department.
1897: The railway comes under control of Civil Department.
1898: Local island government announces its intention of carrying on the work itself. Plans formulated by Chief Engineer Hasegawa.
Japanese Diet granted 30,000,000 yen for ten years to cover cost of mainline from Taihoku to Takow.
1900: The Keelung and Hsinchu lines were repaired. Rolling stock was added. Work commenced on the short branch line from Taihoku to Tansui; completed in June 1901. Over 7 million yen spent by Japanese government on Formosan railways by 1903.
1908: Mainline from Taihoku to Takao is completed.
1922: The West Coast line (Chikunan - Shōka) is completed.
1924: The Giran line (Hatto - Suō)  is completed.
1926: The Taitō Line (Karenkō  - Taitō) is completed.
1941: The Heitō line (Takao - Bōryō) is completed.
1940–1945: The railways are repeatedly bombed by the Allies during World War II.
1945: Taiwan is handed over to the Republic of China.
1948: Taiwan Railways Administration established.
1949: Taiwan becomes the main base of the Republic of China government after losing the civil war in the mainland to the Chinese Communist Party.
1979: West Coast line fully electrified. The North-link line is completed.
1989: Rail lines running through downtown Taipei moved underground. The new Taipei Main Station is completed. The Shen-ao line ceases passenger operations.
1991: The South-link line completed, completing the rail loop around Taiwan.
1997: Online reservations become available.
1998: The Former Mountain line ceases operations.
2000: The Yilan line is electrified.
2001: Various special trains targeting tourists are offered.
2003: The North-link line is electrified.
2007: The Taroko Express begins operations. The launch of Local Express trains with the delivery of Taiwan Railway EMU700 series. The Neiwan line is temporarily closed in order to allow the construction of the Liujia line.
2010: The Former Mountain line is reopened to steam trains on special occasions. The Fu-Hsing Semi-Express of the Taiwan Railways Administration was phased out of regular service completely after December 21, 2010.
2011: The Shalun line is opened. The Liujia line is opened.
2012: The Linkou line ceases all operations. The creation of Miss Taiwan Railway.
2013: The Puyuma Express begins operation. The Pingtung line is scheduled to be electrified, completing the electrification of the entire rail loop around Taiwan by 2020.
2014: The new local train EMU800 begins operation. The maximum speed of local trains is increased to 130 km/h.
2021: The new local train EMU900 begins operation.
2022: Final Fu-Hsing Semi-Express train journey.

Network design

TRA's network and services reflect strong centralized planning. Although TRA is one of many passenger transport operators, its infrastructure allows multiple and convenient connections between modes. Joint transportation and land-use planning make railway projects effective land-development tools.

Mainline tunneling
The Japanese planned Taipei's railway tunnel prior to WWII. Their main impetus was the major Chung-Hwa Road (Route 1) trunk highway crossing. Taipei's Railway “Undergroundization” Project (Phase I) was approved in 1979, including Taipei Main Station (TMS), 2.8-miles of two-track underground railway, and Banqiao and Nankang yards. Completed in 1989 and costing US$600 million, it replaced the historic Japanese-era  and Hwashan yard, eliminated grade crossings in Taipei's congested Wanhua District, providing operating efficiencies. Like New York's Penn Station project, which buried 5.5 route-miles between North Bergen, N.J. and Hunterspoint, Queens by 1908, Taipei Main Station catalyzed urban redevelopment. Development was extensive but not without cultural costs. Modern office towers and underground malls replaced Japanese-era wooden shanties and wholesale outlets, but historic temples were preserved.
Later phases completed the four track mainline tunnels, relocated yards to permit transit-oriented development (TOD), and provided a corridor for a much-needed crosstown expressway (Civic Boulevard). By 2008, US$5.8 billion were invested: Banqiao-Xike (16.0 miles) was tunneled, including
all trackage within Taipei City, and Xike-Wudu (3.1 miles) was elevated under the TRA elevatization program. Nankang's Software
Park, Exhibition Centre, and Xike's Science Park were developed around this time.

Run-through services

Taipei is Taiwan's capital and ultimate destination for TRA's mainlines. Explosive growth since 1980 made Taipei a 10-million population metropolis sprawled over four counties. To accommodate suburban commuters, and to serve passengers traveling to/from suburban business districts, Taipei was envisioned as a through station, allowing West coast trains to operate to Taipei's eastern suburbs, and vice versa.

Through-running reduces platform occupancy times, maximizes one-seat rides, and distributes passengers over multiple stations, reducing crowding. Trains can be moved through Taipei's terminal district in arrival sequence, providing some delay absorption capability. Only ~20% of passenger trips originated/terminated at Taipei Main Station. Trains are turned at outlying yards (where turnback tracks are expressly provided), minimizing conflicting movements. Observation at Banqiao revealed substantial transfer activity between TRA and metro.

In the 1990s, east coast trains terminated at Banqiao; WCML trains terminated at Nankang/Keelung. All trains thus operate over the busy Banqiao-Nankang (Bannan) section, effectively providing urban
transportation by utilizing surplus capacity on longer-distance through trains. Commuter trains made all suburban stops, while Amtrak-like expresses stopped only at major hubs. These days, most East Coast services terminate at Shulin Station, which is the location of a major TRA yard. West Coast services mainly terminate at Qidu Station, which is the location of another large rail yard.

Railway facility relocation

To support metropolitan growth, Banqiao yard moved west to Shulin, and Nankang yard east to Qidu during the mid-2000s, extending through operations to approximately 10 miles either side. Banqiao, Taipei, and Nankang became major interchanges. Like Boston's NorthPoint project planned for a Boston & Maine yard, the former Banqiao yard is now Banqiao station and a successful TOD site. Like the CREATE (Chicago Region Environmental and Transportation Efficiency) plan, through-running allows yards and freight facilities to move from center city (Hwashan, Songshan) to suburbs (Shulin, Qidu), with cheaper land and better highway access.

Rapid transit integration
Taipei metro shows substantial integration with the network, reflecting Taipei's close municipal central government relationship. Taipei Rapid Transit Corporation's (TRTC)  was converted from Tamsui railway line, while  and  roughly follow the TRA mainline and the former Xindian railway line. TRA accepts metro farecards within metropolitan Taipei. Four metro lines converge at Taipei Main Station, making subways the local distribution system of TRA. New intercity bus terminals were constructed near Taipei Main Station in 2009. Like NJ Transit’s Newark and LIRR’s Jamaica stations, Banqiao and Nankang interchanges afford TRA penetration into western and eastern
neighbourhoods without long hackney rides or backtracking.

Commuter rail and HSR
TRA’s maximum commercial speed is 130 km/h (81 mph) whereas HSR operates up to 300 km/h (187 mph). Although TRA’s long-distance services potentially competes with HSR, Taiwan’s HSR is focused on origin-destination markets over 100 miles like Taipei-Taichung (HSR – 50 minutes; TRA – 110 minutes), whereas TRA serves shorter-haul trips like Taipei-Hsinchu (35 versus 60 minutes).
HSR serves Taipei, Banqiao, and Nangang TRA interchanges via shared corridors. Except for Taipei, HSR stations are located out-of-town, minimizing environmental impacts and property acquisition, maximizing economic development potential, and allowing low curvature alignments. Commuter rail connects HSR with established provincial downtowns, solving “last mile” problems.

In Hsinchu, HSR and TRA stations are three miles apart. Parts of TRA's Neiwan line were electrified and rebuilt as a modern commuter railroad, costing US$280 million to connect Hsinchu's historic downtown with the HSR. Connections generate benefits for both modes and catalyze development near HSR stations, much as Interstate interchanges attracted economic activity. This is a transit-oriented version of Beltway success stories played out across 1980s America.

Infrastructure and scheduling

TRA's infrastructure might be described as making up for lower track miles with sidings. TRA operated single-track sections on busy mainlines until 1998. Double-track sections can accommodate trains at different speeds; passing movements don't interference with opposing traffic, allowing scheduled throughputs of ~15 trains per hour per direction. Scheduling practices assume staff can respond to
unforeseen delays and out-of-sequence trains by dynamically utilizing available infrastructure.

TRA has recently installed advanced signalling on the northernmost portion of the West Coast line around Taipei, and has performed extensive capacity analysis to maximize train throughputs.

Passing tracks at local stations
Double-ended sidings (loops) good for typical passenger trains (10~12 cars) are provided at 3~8 mile intervals, at local stations. Some stations have an island platform serving middle siding tracks, and straight-through outside bypass tracks. Schedules provide extra dwell time for trains to hold until an express passes, also serving as en route recovery time, improving reliability. Some stations in single-track territory feature three passing tracks, allowing freight or other equipment to be stowed while opposing passenger trains pass one another. Close proximity of sidings allow TRA to squeeze 5~6 tph (both directions, mixed traffic) out of single-tracks.

Double island platforms at transfer stations
Train terminations and transfers (express/local, branch/mainline) occur at strategic interchanges where
double island platforms and full crossovers are provided. Platforms between siding and mainline
provide cross-platform transfers, and allow staff to clear terminating trains without obstructing mainline.
Where many trains originate/terminate, additional platforms are provided. Crossovers allow convenient
layover access and easy multiple-unit (MU) reversals.

Side platforms and through tracks
Island platforms are not ideal for vertical passenger flow. Side platforms allow direct access from stationhouse through fare control. Through track serves the stationhouse at major stations, where most expresses stop. Middle bypass tracks are available for switching, temporary equipment storage, train preparation, and allows passenger trains to pass freights.
Stationhouses are usually on the northbound side (up direction, to Taipei), where originating passengers are voluminous. At minor stations, mainline serves the island platform; locals serve the stationhouse while waiting for overtaking expresses.

Explicit scheduling and dispatching priorities
Like classic American railroads, TRA's published timetable specifies train class (thus dispatching priority). Premium-fare expresses, like Tze-Chiang, have highest priority and almost never take sidings. Customers understand the system, and aren't surprised when lower priority trains are held, allowing others to pass. Dispatching decisions are fairly straightforward; even when trains are out of sequence, stationmasters wouldn't hesitate to hold trains if releasing them could delay a subsequent Tze-Chiang. Close proximity of sidings mean unscheduled holds are likely short, usually less than 5 minutes.

Schedule, ridership pattern, and demographics
TRA's schedules are not tightly constrained by clock face patterns or policy headways. Extra trains and cars are added on peak travel days to accommodate holiday traffic. 6~8% more departures are scheduled on Fridays, Saturdays, and Sundays. TRA riders span the full gamut including lower-income (students, young adults) and minorities (Hakka, Taiwanese aborigines) but also choice riders (vacationing families, foreign tourists, monthly commuters). Elderly passengers are common, but wheelchair passengers are rare; not all stations are handicap accessible and not all rolling stock are level-boarding.
Fare differentials between expresses and locals provide market differentiation. HSR ridership is observably more affluent, capturing many former airline passengers.

Operating practices

Operations on different railroads are variations of same general principles. TRA's practices are like JR's – somewhat labour-intensive, but immediate on-site accountability and close supervision contribute to high service quality, good delay-recovery capabilities, skills to execute complex maneuvers, and throughputs closer to theoretical line capacity than otherwise achievable.

Stationmasters, train regulation, and dwell process
Many TRA stations have "stationmaster duty offices." Stationmasters (their deputies, or platform staff) perform train regulation and signalling functions right from the platform, and provide train crew oversight. Two station crewmembers work busy locations, one per direction. They sound a whistle to warn waiting passengers of imminent arrivals. Passengers standing in yellow danger zones are asked to step back. As trains approach, they hand-signal drivers. Unreserved trains (without assigned cars) berth close to fare control, while expresses berth according to platform car markers, minimizing onboard baggage-carrying by passengers looking for assigned seats.
Stationmasters may indirectly reduce overruns by providing immediate accountability.

TRA's stationmasters and conductors jointly manage dwell time, like their counterparts at LIRR's Jamaica. Stationmasters regulate trains by enforcing correct train sequences and departure times; holding to time is actually a legal requirement. At transfer locations, they manage connections.
About ½-minute prior to departure, stationmasters sound platform bells to signal impending departure.
When trains are late, bell is given sooner, shortening dwell times. Once conductors close train doors, stationmasters give the "right away" using platform-mounted equipment. After departure,
stationmasters remain on platforms, visually inspecting departing trains.

Conductors as captains
On board, conductors' primary responsibilities are not ticket examinations – station fare controls provide coverage. Instead, conductors operate doors and announcement systems, ensure onboard safety, sell onboard tickets, provide customer information and assistance, supervise onboard crews, perform emergency procedures, and troubleshoot equipment where possible. They have overall responsibility for smooth onboard operations and customer experience, actively directing cleaners, attendants, even bento vendors.

Onboard services

On TRA expresses, cleaners periodically move through the train to remove trash, even proactively asking passengers if visible food items are finished. Train attendants offer bento boxes, drinks, souvenirs, and Sun Cakes (traditional gifts for visiting friends) from small carts.

Ticketing

TRA's tickets were printed on traditional Edmondson presses until Japan's NEC supplied a computerized ticketing and reservation system in the late 1980s. Almost all stations are divided into paid (platform) and unpaid (waiting room) areas. Normally, ticket examiners govern platform access, checking and punching tickets as passengers enter. Conductors perform onboard ticket checks near peak load points or every ~100 miles, verifying that passengers hold train-class appropriate tickets, and dispense step-up and zone extension fares from portable ticket printers. Examiners also control access to unpaid areas at destinations, ensuring all passengers paid full distance-based fares. Used tickets are collected and not returned to passengers unless cancelled by stamps (similar to postmarks). Those arriving without appropriate tickets (i.e. requiring "fare adjustments") are assessed 50% penalties, giving passengers incentives to find conductors on board to purchase step-up fares. Tickets are validated at origin, destination, and sometimes en route; evasion thus would require elaborate two-ticket schemes or exiting from paid area without going through fare control. Fare evasion rates are thought to be low. Proof-of-payment methods are not used.

Fare structure
TRA's passenger fares are highly regulated and strictly distance/train-class based (short trips <6.3 miles require 34~73 cents minimum fare.) Express fares are 11.7 cents (per passenger-mile); locals are 5.5 cents. Within Taipei municipal zone, single trips are 58 cents regardless of distance/class. Unlike HSR, no time- or demand-based off-peak discounts are offered. Periodic (limited-ride) commutation
tickets and multi-ride carnets are available. Fares are generally competitive with private commuter and
intercity buses. Express trains operate with higher load factors and are more profitable.

Fare validation
Fare validation requires substantial infrastructure (paid/unpaid areas), labour-intensive manual ticket examinations, and consequent speed-accuracy trade-offs. During the 2000s, TRA incrementally replaced older thermal ticket printers with automated fare collection (AFC) devices using magnetic-backed stock. Busy stations have faregates to speed up validation. Tickets can be inserted in any orientation. Gates align, check, and mechanically punch tickets prior to opening. Validations are fast and can be "pipelined" or "stacked" (i.e. following passenger can insert ticket while previous passenger is proceeding through the gate). Passenger counting sensors quickly close gates when as many passengers entered as valid tickets processed. When exiting, faregates collect and cancel single trip tickets.

However, many locations still use heat-sensitive tickets without ATC, requiring one ticket examiner per fare control. Examiners punch and collect non-magnetic tickets, provide customer information and assistance, troubleshoot AFC malfunctions (e.g. mutilated tickets), and return cancelled (stamped) tickets to passengers requiring proof-of-travel for expense claims. TRA volunteers (with yellow vest) staff some gates. Volunteers, like America's auxiliary police and volunteer firefighters, include carefully selected and specifically trained members of the public, and retired industry personnel. They assist passengers, sometimes exercising Japanese or English language skills, and report turnstile jumpers and AFC malfunctions to employees. Station management has considerable latitude in determining work scope of volunteers.

Ticketing processes
Most TRA stations feature staffed ticket offices, supplemented by ticket vending machines (TVMs) at busy locations. Unreserved single or day-return tickets must be purchased on the day of travel (to prevent ticket reuse), leading to ticket queues at peak commuter periods. Passengers purchasing advance tickets can delay entire queues, causing imminent train departures to be missed. To maximize passenger throughput, separate ticket windows provide train information, today's tickets, and advance or commutation tickets. Some daily ticket windows only accept cash, further decreasing transaction times. Ticket windows at busy stations can be dynamically switched between different functions, minimizing daily ticket queues.

Fare vending machines
Early machines designed primarily for commuters are essentially receipt printers,
accepting only coins (no bills) and prepaid magnetic TransitChek-like cards – not credit cards.
Passengers must first insert coins (amount deposited is displayed), then press numerous lighted buttons sequentially to specify traveller count, train class, single/return/concessionary, and destination. Buttons light up only when adequate coins are inserted. TVMs sell only unreserved single/round-trips to local destinations (<50 miles) from the current station. Earlier button presses constrain subsequent choices: destinations for which insufficient fares were paid (in selected train class) do not activate and have no effect.

This machine's target audience is regular travellers who already know required fares. Passenger experiences for first-time customers can be confusing, but once customers learn this TVM, unreserved day ticket transactions are processed much faster than on typical full-feature machines. Machines need only electricity (not network connections) and staff to replace ticket stock, remove coins, and clear jams.
Like soda machines, they are robust, self-contained, and have been deployed to remote locations.

Long distance TVMs selling advance-purchase, reserved-seating, and prepaid internet/phone tickets were developed later. These more complex machines, functionally similar to Amtrak's Quik-Trak, are available at principal West coast stations.

Contactless Smartcard fare payment
TRTC pioneered transitcards in 2000 via affiliate Taipei Smart Card Corporation, which performs backoffice functions for TRTC, Taipei's Taipei Joint Bus System (market-sharing conference) group of bus companies, and other EasyCard merchants. In 2008, TRTC assisted TRA in implementing entry-exit smartcard fare collection for local travel within Taipei's metropolitan zone (Keelung-Zhongli), offering 10% discounts from regular local train fares. Smartcard holders can travel on regular local and
express trains, but not Tarokos, Puyumas, sightseeing specials, nor in business class. When travelling on expresses, smartcard seats are unreserved. As expresses are often sold out, EasyCard offers de facto standee discounts. Travelers with only a smartcard entry and no reserved seat ticket boarding onto Taroko and Puyumas express trains will receive a considerable fine. All others including Chu-kuang and Tze-chiang express trains are available for smartcard entry.

Origin/destination validation and existing fare control areas made smartcard implementation easier.
Instead of punching tickets to enter and relinquishing tickets to exit, users tap-in and tap-out. Faregates are replaced with newer integrated designs as funding allows. In the interim, ticket collectors visually verify each transaction on low-cost stand-alone terminals, allowing rapid deployment.

Smartcard development in Taiwan is currently fluid. With 13 million cards issued, readers for Mifare
Classic-based EasyCard are already installed at convenience stores like Family Mart.
Legislation authorizing "Third Generation e-Purse" (stored value limit ~US$300) was passed in March 2010, allowing smartcard payments for low-value non-transportation items, like Hong Kong's Octopus Card. Three major competitors hold regional subway/bus fare collection franchises (Taipei's "Youyoka" EasyCard, Mid-Island's Taiwan Easy Go "TaiwanTong", and Kaohsiung's "I Pass"), and TRA has active pilots with both EasyCard and TaiwanTong. Taiwan's MOTC expects to eventually integrate all electronic farecard systems nationwide.

Rail pass

Besides single ticket, TRA has also been offering various types of rail pass, with which travelers can ride on trains without buying single tickets. Currently, TRA offers TR Pass to travelers such that they have unlimited ride on trains within the set period. The pass has two versions - the General Pass and the Student Pass. TRA first offered the Student Pass to foreign students in December 2006 in order to attract more foreign visitors. The offer was extended to local students in 2009. Finally, parallel to the Student Pass, a General Pass, which could be used by everyone, was issued in 2010, so as to replace the ineffective "Round-the Island Pass", which had been offered since 1998.

The Round-the Island Pass had several restrictions making it unpopular. First, holders of the pass must either travel in the clockwise or anti-clockwise direction without traveling backwards. Secondly, travelers could only pick seven stops to get off and visit. Once a traveler has got off in seven stations, the pass became invalid. These restrictions were deemed too restrictive and limited the use of the pass. After the issue of TR General Pass in 2010, this pass ceased to be issued.

Passenger information systems and signage

TRA takes a holistic and comprehensive approach towards passenger information. Devices used (in both English and Chinese) range from schedule posters, fixed signage to departure monitors and next-train displays.

Split-flap display boards, monitors, or smaller LED displays are provided at major terminals and principal stations. One display per control area shows boarding times and track assignments. Delays as short as one minute are posted. Large acrylic signboards show departure times and fares at smaller stations. Ubiquitous clocks throughout stations and facilities make it difficult to find spots where fewer than two clocks are immediately visible.

Platform signage, next train identifiers

Backlit acrylic signs (airport-style with iconic representations) identify platform and carriage numbers, and provide directions to facilities like restrooms and elevators. Boxes display schedules, tourist information, and service change notices. Large signs (legible from passing trains) indicate station names, and distances to previous/next stations, for use by passengers and crew. Platform LED displays provide next train identity, departure time, delay information, and context-sensitive
messages, including public service announcements.

Onboard displays and announcements
TRA's mixed fleet ranges from 1960s hauled stock to new Tarokos and commuter trains. Newer trains feature automated display/announcement systems with high-density dot-matrix LEDs like Taipei's metro. On long-distance coaches with longer time between station stops, scrolling displays are used. Like in Continental Europe, automated onboard announcements are multilingual.
Announcements are in four major languages (Mandarin, Taiwanese, Hakka, and English). In rural areas, announcements are also made in local aboriginal languages; Taitung line has the aboriginal Pangcah/Amis language. In unusual situations, conductors can usually make announcements in at least two languages.

Trains lacking automatic train location features are not simple to retrofit. TRA devised low-cost multi-lingual "announcement boxes" connected to the public address system, manually triggered by conductors on approach to stations.

Exterior train identification
Identifying arriving trains quickly and accurately is equally important to employees and passengers.
Classically, lighted acrylic destination signboards are manually changed at terminals. Recent modernization efforts provided exterior LED displays showing destination, route, train number, and class. Newest cars have bilingual flexible displays built-in. Train numbers are especially important on expresses, helping customers identify seat reservations.

Modernisation

Under the Railway Bureau, many projects have been undertaken to modernise the railway system and improve its efficiency.

Under the "East Railway Improvement Project", the route between Taipei and Hualien was electrified. The section between Badu (in Keelung) and Taitung was improved by changing to 50 kg/m rail, automating traffic signals, and including portions of double tracks. Work began in June 1998 and was completed in December 2004, costing NT$43.691 billion. The "Continued Improvement of Eastern Railways Project" was approved by the Executive Yuan on June 30, 2003, and involved a  stretch between Dongshan and the Wulaokeng River. It included the construction of the elevated Dongshan Station as well as two branch lines. The project cost NT$2.779 billion, began in February 2004, and was completed by the end of 2008.

The first phase of the project is expected to be completed by the end of 2013 and will cut travel time between Taipei and Taitung down by about 1.5 hours. Completion of drilling for the Shanli Tunnel, the longest on the modified route, took place in March 2012.

Corporatization of TRA 
Because of the several hundred-billions TWD of liabilities, and the legal person type of TRA is considered a block for elasticity operations of railway systems, there were several campaigns and groups set up that aim to take privatization and corporatization actions for TRA since 1990s. In May 2022 the Executive Yuan approved an act, called Taiwan Railways Limited Liability Company establishment ordinance, it's ruled that TRA will transit to be a state-owned railway company that operate exclusively by the government, setup a fund to handle debts of TRA, no employees of TRA will be axed, and consider raising up salaries by 3~5%. According to the ordinance, TRA is scheduled be renamed to Taiwan Railways Limited Liability Company by January 1, 2024.

Lines

Current passenger lines
:  to 
Coastal section:  to 
 :  to 
 : Pingtung to Taitung

Branches
:  to 
:  to 
:  to 
Chengzhui line:  to 
:  to 
 :  to 
:  to

Other lines
Keelung Harbour line
Hualien Harbour line
Taichung Harbour line
Kaohsiung Harbour line
Former Mountain line: Sanyi to Houli. A former path of the Taichung line closed in 1998. Reopened in 2010 to steam trains on special occasions.  has been declared a historical site.

Planned
Hengchun line (恆春線): Kaohsiung - Kenting

Defunct
Donggang line (東港線): Zhenan, Pingtung County – Donggang, Pingtung County. Passenger service discontinued in 1991, completely closed in 2002.
Dongshi line (東勢線): Fengyuan, Taichung City to Dongshi, Taichung City. Passenger service discontinued in 1991. Transformed into a bike trail by the Taichung City government.
Shengang line (神岡線): Tanzi, Taichung City to Daya, Taichung City. Service discontinued in 1999. Also transformed into a bike trail.
Tamsui line (淡水線):  to Tamsui, New Taipei City, closed in 1988 for metro construction.
Hsintien line (新店線):  to Xindian, closed in 1965. Replaced by the Taipei Metro  of Taipei Metro on a similar route.
Linkou line (林口線): Taoyuan District to Linkou District, closed in 2012. Transformed into a bike trail.
Xinbeitou branch line (新北投線): Beitou District (Beitou station to Xinbeitou station), closed in 1988 for metro construction. Replaced by the Xinbeitou branch line of the Taipei Metro.
Songshan Airport line: Songshan station to Songshan Airport, closed in 1976.
Hsinchu Airport line: Hsinchu station to Hsinchu Airport, closed in 1997 and converted to a road.
Kaohsiung Port line: Kaohsiung station to Kaohsiung Port station, closed in 2018 and converted to the circular light rail line.
Pingtung Airport Line: Pingtung station to Pingtung Airport, closed in 1997.
Zhonghe line: Banqiao station to Zhonghe station, closed in 1990 for metro construction. Replaced by Taipei Metro  of Taipei Metro.
Sanzhangli branch line: Huashan station to Lianqin 44th Arsenal, closed in 1986.

Services

Regular services

With the exception of the Ordinary services (see below), all trains are modern and air conditioned. Many of the Ordinary train carriages, on the other hand, are almost 40 to 50 years old.

Limited services
 Diesel express: Only available on the Pingtung line. Fares are equal to regional express trains.

Retired services
 Kuang-hua express Operated using the DR2700 series from 1966 to 1979. It set the TRA's pre-electrification speed record.
 Kuang-kuang number Operated using locomotive hauled coaches from 1961 to 1978.  Featuring dining cars, it was Taiwan Railways' premier service during that period.
 Ordinary: Stops at all stations, no air conditioning, least expensive. No assigned seating.

Chu-kuang Express
In 1970, the Taiwan Railways Administration solicited equipment loans from the World Bank to increase transport capacity, the most important passenger vehicle is the 35SP32850 class, purchased from a consortium led by Japan's Hitachi, for a total of 27 vehicles.

On February 3, 1970, Chu-kuang service was initiated with Trains #1011 through #1014 on the West Coast line between Taipei and Taichung, hauled by EMD G22 class diesels (TRA classification R100 class). Fares were set at three times the per-mile cost of ordinary local service, as much as NT$117 for certain origin-destination pairs. On February 20 of the same year, the service was initiated between Taipei and Kaohsiung.

The first Chu-kuang Expresses in the 1970s used a variety of different vehicles; although the models vary, but the body are universally white with blue line, with one door per side, and in the interior there are carpets and velvet sofa seats. After the completion of the West Coast line electrification project in 1978, all coach bodies were fully painted into orange livery, and service continued to grow.

1986 saw the introduction of rooftop air-conditioning type Chu-kuang coaches (10200 series), like the previous launch of 35SPK2200 on the Fu-Hsing Express, the air conditioner is moved to the stainless steel lightweight roof, and each coach was outfitted with a single door per side (manually operated). In addition, these Chu-kuang saw introduction of TRA's first disability-accessible coach, the FPK11300 type.

Vehicles
TRA uses a variety of railway vehicles to provide both freight and passenger service.

 Diesel electric locomotives: Primarily road engines and road switchers built by Electro-Motive Division of the United States, entirely of the EMD "G" classes. Hitachi road diesels were used until the 1980. Road switchers were retired in the 1990s.
 Diesel hydraulic locomotives: Originally purchased in the 1970s for the narrow-gauge East Coast Mainline, re-gauged for  after the line was converted. Mostly used for switching duties.
 AC electric locomotives: Primarily electric locomotives built by Union Carriage & Wagon of South Africa, and General Electric of the United States. GE delivered their units in 3 classes of roughly 100 units each-2 with HEP, and one without. These are the E200, E400, and E300 series, respectively. The South African-built units (E100 series) were retired in the early 2000s
 Diesel multiple units: A variety of diesel multiple units had been built for the TRA, mostly by Japanese manufacturer Tokyu. They are DMU2900, DMU3000, DMU3100.
 AC electric multiple units: TRA's electric multiple units (EMUs) are classified as either long-distance units or local trains (or local express). Numerous builders have constructed EMUs for TRA: EMU100 from British Rail Engineering Limited of England. EMU200, EMU400 from Union Carriage & Wagon of South Africa. EMU300 from Socimi of Italy. EMU500, EMU600 from Daewoo and Hyundai of Korea. And EMU700, EMU800 from both Nippon-Sharyo of Japan and TRSC of Taiwan in their series number order. EMU900 from Hyundai Rotem of Korea. EMU1200 from TRSC of Taiwan. There is also the EMU3000 series introduced in 2021.
 Tilting trainsets: TEMU1000 for Taroko Express passenger service built by Hitachi of Japan. TEMU2000 for Puyuma Express passenger service built by Nippon-Sharyo of Japan.
 Push-pull trains (Taiwan Railway E1000 series): High-capacity express passenger trains. The locomotives were built by UCW of South Africa, while the carriages were built by Hyundai of Korea. Extra cars for the push-pull trainsets were manufactured by Rotem.
 Hauled coaching stock: Commuter stock from India, express passenger stock from Japan and Korea, as well as various homemade coaching stock fabricated by Taiwanese companies.
 Freight wagons: gondolas, covered hoppers, boxcars, refrigerated boxcars, livestock cars, flatcars, mail cars, etc.
 Non-revenue vehicles: includes cabooses, catenary maintenance vehicles, switchers, and converted former revenue vehicles used for special purposes.

See also
Rail transport in Taiwan
Transportation in Taiwan
Taiwan High Speed Rail
Taipei Railway Workshop
Taiwan Railway Mealbox

Notes

Words in native languages

References

Citations

Sources

External links

Taiwan Railways Administration
Useful, user-friendly English website, including routes and schedules: Taiwan Railways Administration (English website)

 
Railway companies of Taiwan